A Golden Christmas is a 2009 Christmas romance movie starring Andrea Roth and Nicholas Brendon. The television movie premiered on December 13, 2009 as Ion Television's first original television movie. Plot: "A woman visits her parents for Christmas. Hearing that they've "sold" the house, she wants to buy it. At 9 she had a BFF in the woods nearby named Han Solo. She and the buyer are single, divorced and have a child each. Is he her Han?"

Cast
 Andrea Roth as Jessica
 Nicholas Brendon as Michael
 Bruce Davison as Rod, Jessica's father
 Alley Mills as Katherine, Jessica's mother
 Elisa Donovan as Anna, Jessica's sister
 Jason London as Mitch
Daniel Zykov as Henry, Jessica's son
Melody Hollis as Madeline, Michael's daughter
Robert Seay as Chet, the realtor

Series continuation
Two quasi-sequels were made:
3 Holiday Tails, a.k.a. A Golden Christmas 2: The Second Tail, a 2011 direct-to-DVD film, saw a young post-college couple reuniting due to "interference" by several golden retrievers, and a sub-plot having two pre-teens becoming good friends. Only Mills and Davison reprised their roles.
A Golden Christmas 3, a.k.a. Home For Christmas, a TV movie released November 2012, featured childhood friends reuniting in love, again due to "magical" circumstance involving several golden retrievers. Alexandra Peters reprises her role from A Golden Christmas 2.

Home media
The film was released on DVD on October 12, 2010.

See also 
 List of Christmas films

References

External links
 
 
 

2009 television films
2009 films
American television films
American Christmas films
Films directed by John Murlowski
Christmas television films
2000s English-language films